is a railway station on the Gotōji Line in Kama, Fukuoka, Japan, operated by Kyushu Railway Company (JR Kyushu).

Lines
Shimo-Kamoo Station is served by the Gotōji Line.

Adjacent stations

See also
 List of railway stations in Japan

External links

  

Railway stations in Fukuoka Prefecture
Railway stations in Japan opened in 1916